Philippine Studies: Historical and Ethnographic Viewpoints is a quarterly peer-reviewed academic journal covering research on the history and ethnography of the Philippines and its peoples. It is published by the Ateneo de Manila University and was established by Leo A. Cullum in 1953 as Philippine Studies, obtaining its subtitle in 2012. The editor-in-chief is Filomeno V. Aguilar, Jr. Issues can be accessed via its website, the university's journals portal, and other online databases such as JSTOR and Project MUSE.

In 2007, a redesign of the journal was commissioned "to make the journal more appealing to a younger generation of scholars and academics." All covers were blue and gray prior to the redesign. The new look features a distinctive cover color that varies per issue and a new layout that is "more sensitive to the inclusion of graphics."

List of editors-in-chief
Leo A. Cullum (1953–1956)
Miguel A. Bernad (1956–1959)
Horacio de la Costa (1959–1964)
Pacifico A. Ortiz (1965–1967)
Antonio V. Romuáldez (1967–1971)
José S. Arcilla (Acting, 1971)
Roque J. Ferriols (1972–1975)
John N. Schumacher (1975–1978)
Joseph L. Roche (1978–1984)
Joseph A. Galdon (1984–2002)
Antonette P. Angeles (Acting, 2000)
Doreen G. Fernandez (2002)
Filomeno V. Aguilar Jr. (2003–present)

References

External links

Southeast Asian studies journals
Ateneo de Manila University
English-language journals
Ethnography journals
Publications established in 1953
Quarterly journals
Works about the Philippines